Charlie Chan's Chance is a 1932 American pre-Code murder mystery film, the third to star Warner Oland as detective Charlie Chan. It is based on the 1928 novel Behind That Curtain by Earl Derr Biggers, who also contributed to the film. The film is considered to be lost.

Plot
Charlie Chan is attending a police convention in New York City; he is an intended murder victim here, but avoids death by chance. To find his would-be-killer(s), Charlie must outguess police reps from both Scotland Yard and New York City Police.

Cast
Warner Oland as Charlie Chan
Alexander Kirkland as John R. Douglas
H.B. Warner as Inspector Fife
Marian Nixon as Shirley Marlowe
Linda Watkins as Gloria Garland
James Kirkwood as Inspector Flannery
Ralph Morgan as Barry Kirk
James Todd as Kenneth Dunwood
Herbert Bunston as Garrick Enderly
James Wang as Kee-Lin
Joe Brown as Doctor
Charles McNaughton as Paradise
Edward Peil Sr. as Li Gung

Cast notes:
 Thomas A. Curran the early American silent film star plays an uncredited bit part.

See also
List of lost films
1937 Fox vault fire

References

External links

1932 films
American black-and-white films
Charlie Chan films
American detective films
Films based on American novels
Films directed by John G. Blystone
Lost American films
Fox Film films
American mystery films
1930s mystery films
1932 lost films
1930s American films